Miguel Pamintuan de Leon, also known as Mike de Leon (born May 24, 1947), is a Filipino film director, cinematographer, scriptwriter and film producer.

Biography
He was born in Manila on 24 May 1947 to Manuel de Leon and Imelda Pamintuan. His interest in filmmaking began when he pursued a master's degree in Art History at the University of Heidelberg in Germany.

De Leon first made two short films namely: Sa Bisperas (On the Eve), in 1972, and Monologo (Monologue), in 1975. He established the Cinema Artists Philippines that same year. He produced and served as cinematographer for Lino Brocka's Maynila: Sa mga Kuko ng Liwanag in 1975. He won best cinematography award from the  Filipino Academy of Movie Arts and Sciences (FAMAS) for Maynila.

De Leon's first major full-length work was Itim (Black) in 1976. It was an in-depth study of guilt and violence and shows De Leon's delicate balancing of cinematic elements to project mood and character. It was voted by the Philippine's Urian Awards as one of the Ten Outstanding Films of the Decade: 1970-79. The film also won him the best director award during the 1978 Asian Film Festival held in Sydney, Australia.

When De Leon created Kung Mangarap Ka't Magising in 1977, it became a tribute to his grandmother Narcisa de Leon (Doña Sisang) to celebrate the centennial of the family's film company, LVN Pictures. Known for his varied experiments in styles of film directing, he pushed the birth of the new musical in Kakabakaba Ka Ba?, a landmark film which portrayed a number of self-important totems of Philippine society. Kakabakaba Ka ba? won for De Leon the Urian award for best director.

His other movies include Kisapmata (1981), Batch '81 (1982) and Sister Stella L. (1984).  In these films he tackled social and political issues with powerful and disturbing imagery. His blockbuster film, Hindi Nahahati ang Langit (1985) was an adaptation from an earlier Filipino Komiks version of the same title. In 1987, De Leon also made Bilanggo sa Dilim, a full-length video commissioned by Sony Entertainment.

De Leon explored subjects such as incest, fraternity violence, and the Filipino workers' cause. These were themes that were portrayed in the films Kisapmata, Batch '81 and Sister Stella L. respectively. These films were later listed as the Philippines's Ten Outstanding Films of the Decade: 1980-1989 by the Philippines' Urian Awards.

Later on, Batch '81 was voted best picture by the Film Academy of the Philippines (FAP) where De Leon also won a best screenplay award. For Sister Stella L., he won best director and best screenplay in the Philippines's Urian Awards in 1984. Kisapmata and Batch '81 were presented during the Directors' Fortnight at the 1982 Cannes Film Festival.  The film Sister Stella L. competed for the Golden Lion at the 41st Venice International Film Festival.

De Leon pioneered the use of computer graphics animation for the TV advertising industry in 1988. De Leon's film, Aliwan Paradise, became a part of the Southern Winds in 1993, which is a collection of four films from Indonesia, Thailand, the Philippines, and Japan.  The NHK and Japan Foundation commissioned this film anthology.

Achievements
Mike de Leon received the Parangal Sentenyal sa Sining at Kultura at the Cultural Center of the Philippines in February 1999. His Batch '81 and Sister Stella L. had been among the 25 Filipino films shown in New York from July 31 to August 1999, organized by the Film Society of Lincoln Center, in partnership with the Philippine Centennial Commission, the Cultural Center of the Philippines, IFFCOM, the Philippine Information Agency, the Consulate General of the Philippines in New York and the Philippine Centennial Coordinating Council - Northeast USA. These series of Filipino films were presented at the Walter Reade Theater of the Lincoln Center, in celebration of the 100th year of Philippine Independence.

Filmography

Awards

References

External links
 
 The thin line between genius and sanity

1947 births
Living people
De Leon, Mike
Filipino film directors
Filipino screenwriters
Filipino film studio executives